Ayumi Hamasaki Concert Tour 2000 Vol.2 is the second session DVD of the live tour of the Japanese singer Ayumi Hamasaki that was released on September 27, 2000.

Similar to Ayumi Hamasaki Concert Tour 2000 Vol.1, there is also a multi-angle function in the DVD. However, unlike the other concert, there is no backstage view in this concert. The second angle showcases the video effects on the giant video screen in the concert.

Track listing
 A Song for ××
 vogue
 Trauma
 SEASONS
 Far away
 End roll
 LOVE 〜Destiny〜
 appears
 ever free
 WHATEVER
 Depend on you
 Fly high

Encore
 Boys & Girls
 Trauma
 Who…
Special Backstage Shot
Credir

Ayumi Hamasaki video albums
2000 video albums
Live video albums
2000 live albums